The 2022 Michigan elections were held on Tuesday, November 8, 2022 throughout Michigan. The Democratic Party made historic gains, taking full control of state government for the first time since 1983. Democrats won control of the Michigan House of Representatives for the first time since 2008, and the Michigan Senate for the first time since 1984. Additionally, incumbent Democratic Governor Gretchen Whitmer won reelection by a comfortable margin, with Democrats sweeping every statewide office. Furthermore, the Democrats maintained control of their seven seats in the U.S. House of Representatives, while the Republican Party took a net loss of one seat (as the state lost one congressional seat due to reapportionment after the 2020 census). The elections in Michigan were widely characterized as a "blue wave".

Federal

Congress

House of Representatives
Democrats won seven House seats in the United States House of Representatives, winning a majority of the House delegation to the Republicans six.

State

Executive

Governor and Lieutenant Governor

Incumbent Democratic Governor Gretchen Whitmer and Lieutenant Governor Garlin Gilchrist won re-election against Republicans Tudor Dixon and Shane Hernandez by a margin of 10.5%.

Secretary of State

Incumbent Democratic Secretary of State Jocelyn Benson won re-election against Republican Kristina Karamo by a margin of 14%.

Attorney General

Incumbent Democratic Attorney General Dana Nessel won re-election against Republican Matthew DePerno by a margin of 8.6%.

Legislature

Senate

All 38 seats in the Michigan Senate were up for election in 2022.  Democrats gained four seats, flipping the chamber for the first time since 1982.

House of Representatives

All 110 seats in the Michigan House of Representatives were up for election in 2022.  Democrats gained three seats, flipping the chamber for the first time since 2008.

Judiciary

Supreme Court

Two seats on the Michigan Supreme Court were up for election in 2022.

Candidates
Richard H. Bernstein (Democratic), incumbent Associate Justice of the Supreme Court of Michigan (2015–present)
Kyra Harris Bolden (Democratic), incumbent state representative (2019–2023)
Paul Hudson (Republican), attorney and chair of appeals group at Miller Canfield, P.L.C.
Kerry Lee Morgan (Libertarian), attorney and perennial candidate
Brian Zahra (Republican), incumbent Associate Justice of the Supreme Court of Michigan (2011–present)

Results

Ballot initiatives

Proposal 1

Proposal 1, the Legislative Term Limits and Financial Disclosure Amendment, was a legislatively-referred constitutional amendment which modified term limits in the Michigan state legislature. Previously, legislators were limited to serving three terms in the Michigan House of Representatives and two terms in the Michigan Senate. This proposal modified the limit to be a lifetime twelve-year limit for service across both chambers. The proposal also increased financial disclosure requirements for various elected officials. The proposal passed 66-34.

Proposal 2

Proposal 2, the Right to Voting Policies Amendment, was a citizen-initiated constitutional amendment which changed voting procedures in the state with the intent of making it easier for citizens to vote. The proposal passed 60-40.

Proposal 3

Proposal 3, the Right to Reproductive Freedom Initiative, was a citizen-initiated constitutional amendment to protect the right to abortion and contraceptives in the state constitution. The proposal passed 57-43.

Issues
Issues occurred in a few locations with part the Ottawa County Clerk's office losing power and requiring a backup generator, due to a error involving a construction crew that was working on nearby power lines, precincts in Ada Township temporarily running out of ballots, tabulator jams in Kent County due to ballots being marked in pen that had not dried, and long lines as polls were closing at City Hall in Grand Rapids.

References

External links

 
Michigan
Michigan elections by year